Thomas Arthur Spragens (April 25, 1917 – February 11, 2006) was an American administrator and a figure in higher education. He served as the 17th president of Centre College in Danville, Kentucky, from 1957 to 1981. A graduate of the University of Kentucky, Spragens worked for the state and federal government early in his career, before joining the staff at Stanford University as a presidential advisor. He served a five-year term as the president of Stephens College in Columbia, Missouri, and left Stephens to come to Centre.

The first Centre president who was not a part of the clergy, Spragens worked to lessen the ties between the college and the Presbyterian Church, which led to a significant rise in students reporting that they were non-denominational and which led to chapel becoming optional for students. Spragens was also an effective fundraiser for the school, as he made it one of his top priorities upon taking office, and his Fund for the Future Campaign ultimately raised $34 million for the college. He was instrumental in the integration of the school, and admitted Centre's first black student in 1962. The same year, he led an effort to consolidate the school's women's department, formerly the Kentucky College for Women, onto Centre's campus.

During his time at Centre, Spragens was also involved in several other organizations and pursuits, many of which pertained to higher education. He was selected by two governors to serve on commissions which studied higher education within the commonwealth, and was a part of the American Association of Colleges and Universities, the Southern Association of Colleges and Schools, and the American Council on Education at different times. He was active in Democratic Party politics, and was a delegate to the 1968 Democratic National Convention in support of Senator Eugene McCarthy. Additionally, he was a part of an effort which culminated in the 1962 founding of what is now the Southern Collegiate Athletic Conference, of which Centre remained a charter member until 2011.

Early life and education
Spragens was born on April 25, 1917, in Lebanon, Kentucky. He was the third of seven children in his family. His father, William Henry Spragens, was a lawyer and circuit court judge from Casey County, Kentucky, and his mother, Lillian Brewer Spragens, was from Lancaster, Kentucky. Spragens attended Lebanon High School and was recruited by then-president Charles J. Turck to attend Centre, alongside several of his classmates, but attended the University of Kentucky instead. He enrolled in, and attended, the University's College of Commerce (now the Gatton College of Business and Economics) for a year and a half, but afterwards transferred to the College of Arts and Sciences and majored in economics. After a summer employed by the Kentucky state government, Spragens began graduate work at the Maxwell School of Citizenship and Public Affairs at Syracuse University. He completed only one year of his graduate program; after spending the summer following the first year working for the Bureau of the Budget (now the Office of Management and Budget), he decided to forgo the second year in favor of a permanent position with the Bureau.

Career

Early career, 1940–1957
Spragens worked for the federal government from 1940 to 1945 in multiple positions, including in his new permanent job as a senior analyst at the Bureau of the Budget, and in a job with the Foreign Economic Administration, which operated during World War II. After the war's conclusion, Spragens left his government positions in favor of a role at Stanford University. Beginning at Stanford in summer 1946, he worked as an assistant to the president and as Stanford's representative in Washington, D.C. In this position, he assisted two presidents: Donald Tresidder, who originally hired him, and Wallace Sterling, who took over after Tresidder's death. He helped the college to manage its increasing enrollment numbers, which spiked from 4,500 in June 1946 to 7,200 in November of the same year. Spragens intended to remain in this position for only one to two years, and afterwards return to government work, but ended up working there for five years.

In 1951, Spragens left Stanford to accept a position as the secretary and treasurer of the Fund for the Advancement of Education, which was a newly-formed subsidiary of the Ford Foundation. He served in this position for just more than one year before he was offered the presidency of Stephens College, a women's college in Columbia, Missouri. He began in this role in 1952, and spent five years at Stephens until his departure in 1957. During this time, he was selected to be a part of a commission that produced a report, "The Church and Higher Education", to the Synod of North Carolina, which was completed in July 1955.

President of Centre College, 1957–1981
On November 11, 1957, Spragens began his term as the 17th president of Centre College. In doing so, he became the fourth president in the college's history who was not an ordained minister and the first who was not a member of the clergy at all. He spent his first full day on campus the following day, when he presided over his first faculty meeting. Early in his term, Spragens introduced a ten-year plan with the goals of increasing the college's enrollment (with the specific goal of 750 students), adding to the faculty, and increasing the number of majors offered by the college. The following year, the college announced a $6.5 million fundraising campaign in celebration of Centre's 150-year anniversary, a marked increase from the $20,000 to $25,000 typically raised every year. After beginning his term, Spragens immediately declared that the school would move towards full integration and not discriminate by race when determining admissions, and the college admitted its first black student when Timothy Kusi, a Ghanaian student who transferred from Kentucky State College (now Kentucky State University), enrolled in 1962. This change was received well by much of the campus community. The campus of the former Kentucky College for Women, at the time operating as Centre's women's department, closed that same year, at which point it was consolidated onto Centre's campus, with Spragens presiding over the merger. Spragens also hired Shirley Walker, a French professor who was Centre's first black faculty member.

As football grew more popular at Centre during the mid-1960s, Spragens sought to keep the college's priorities on academics rather than athletics. In order to achieve this, he advocated for the creation of a new athletic association which would prevent payment to players and eliminate gate receipts. Centre was joined in this association by Washington and Lee University, Southwestern University at Memphis (now Rhodes College), and the University of the South, with Washington University in St. Louis added later the same year as the league's fifth charter member. This association ultimately became the College Athletic Conference (now the Southern Collegiate Athletic Conference) and was formally founded on September 1, 1962. This plan was met with widespread praise, including from The New York Times. Centre remained a member of the conference until 2011, when they left, along with six other SCAC schools and one independent school, to form the Southern Athletic Association.

Many of the changes that took place on Centre's campus during Spragens's presidency can still be seen on campus. Numerous buildings were constructed or upgraded during his time in office, including the Grace Doherty Library (which took the place of Old Main, which was demolished), the new Young Hall, Sutcliffe Hall, the Regional Arts Center (now the Norton Center for the Arts), Alumni Memorial Gymnasium, and multiple dormitory buildings. Also an effective fundraiser, Spragens led the Fund for the Future campaign, which ultimately raised nearly $34 million for the college. In addition, Centre was selected to obtain a chapter of the Phi Beta Kappa honor society, of which Spragens himself was a member. Spragens' presidency ended upon his resignation on November 16, 1981. Provost Edgar C. Reckard finished the academic year as interim president and Spragens was formally succeeded by Richard L. Morrill on June 1, 1982.

During his time at Centre, Spragens was a member of a number of other institutions related to higher education, including the Kentucky Independent College Foundation, Independent College Funds of America, the Association of American Colleges and Universities, and the Southern Association of Colleges and Schools. He also served as the director of the American Council on Education for three years, and as the director of the Southern University Union for a time. On two occasions, Spragens was asked to interview with the search committee for the presidency of the University of Kentucky, but never received a formal offer, and he was contacted by Kentucky State University to potentially serve as their interim president after he retired from Centre, and ended up as a consultant for one year to the newly-hired president, Raymond Burse, a Centre alumnus himself. He received honorary degrees from a number of colleges and universities: Westminster College, the University of Kentucky, the University of Alabama, Berea College, and Kentucky State University, in addition to Centre.

Personal life and death

Spragens married Catharine Smallwood, a native of Oxford, Mississippi, and an alumna of the University of Mississippi, on May 24, 1941. The couple had two sons, Thomas Jr. and David, and one daughter, Barbara. David, who was their youngest child, graduated from Centre in 1973, during his father's presidency. Catharine survived Thomas for over a decade before her death on March 26, 2016, at the age of 96.

In an interview shortly following his resignation, Spragens stated that his personal hobbies included playing tennis and golf, as well as water skiing. He also involved himself in public and community affairs, and was selected as part of commissions appointed by both Governors Bert Combs and Ned Breathitt to study higher education in Kentucky. Spragens was a member of the Phi Beta Kappa and Omicron Delta Kappa honor societies. In 1990, Thomas and Catharine received the Honorary Alumni Award from Centre.

Spragens died on February 11, 2006, in Columbia, South Carolina, at the age of 88. His funeral was held at the First Presbyterian Church in Danville, on March 4, 2006. He is buried in Danville's Bellevue Cemetery.

Legacy

During his 24-year tenure as president, the college's enrollment nearly doubled, from 380 students to 700, and the size of its faculty followed the same trend. Centre's endowment also grew, from $2.8 million to $18 million. After his retirement from the presidency he served on the Kentucky Council for Higher Education, the board of numerous organizations including Shaker Village, Leadership Kentucky, Presbyterian Homes and Services, and Pikeville College (now the University of Pikeville). He served as a city commissioner in Danville and on committees in Danville's First Presbyterian Church. However, Spragens's tenure saw the college become more distanced from the church than in the past, as the portion of the college's budget obtained from the church decreased and chapel became voluntary for students beginning in 1965. Two years later, Spragens was elected moderator of the Northern Synod of Kentucky and recommended that Centre remove many of its remaining ties to the Presbyterian Church. This came to fruition in 1969, when the college removed its policies which required the president and most board members be Presbyterian. The effects of this were seen on the student body in the following years, with the percentage of students reporting themselves as Presbyterian falling from 32% in 1967 to 17% in 1971, and the percentage of students reporting themselves as non-denominational rising from 0.5% to 27% in the same time period.

Spragens is largely credited for his successful fundraising efforts and for the numerous buildings that were constructed during his presidency, and the Thomas A. Spragens Rare Book Room and Archives, located in the Grace Doherty Library at Centre, is named in his honor. During his lifetime he was very active in the community of Danville and the commonwealth, as well as in civil rights issues, the Presbyterian Church, and Democratic Party politics. He was selected as a delegate to the 1968 Democratic National Convention, held in Chicago, after serving as the chair of the Boyle County Democratic Convention and attending the state convention. He did both in support of Senator Eugene McCarthy of Minnesota, though McCarthy would eventually lose the nomination to Vice President Hubert Humphrey, also of Minnesota. Following the Kent State shootings on May 4, 1970, Spragens declared all classes suspended on May 8, and addressed much of the student body and faculty on the lawn of the campus; many of the students formed committees and teaching groups among themselves.

References

Citations

Bibliography

1917 births
2006 deaths
Burials in Bellevue Cemetery (Danville, Kentucky)
Franklin D. Roosevelt administration personnel
Kentucky Democrats
People from Lebanon, Kentucky
Presidents of Centre College
Stephens College people
Stanford University staff
University of Kentucky alumni